Aymen Bouguerra (born 1 November 2001) is a Tunisian volleyball player. He competed in the 2020 Summer Olympics.

References

2001 births
Living people
Sportspeople from Tunis
People from Narbonne
Volleyball players at the 2020 Summer Olympics
Tunisian men's volleyball players
Olympic volleyball players of Tunisia
Sportspeople from Aude